Leo Sepp (7 November 1892 in Simuna – 13 December 1941 in Solikamsk) was an Estonian financial figure, writer and politician. From 1924 until 1927 he was Minister of Finance.

From 1921 until 1924, he was the director and chairman of the Bank of Estonia. From 1933 until 1938 he was the director of Baltic Cotton Factory. In 1937, using the pen name Rein Sarvesaare, Sepp wrote the play Kaupo, published by Estonian Academic Artists' Association (EAKK).

Following the Soviet occupation of Estonia in 1940, Sepp was arrested by the NKVD and placed within the Gulag camp system. He died in custody in Solikamsk, Perm Oblast in 1941.

References

1892 births
1941 deaths
Finance ministers of Estonia
Estonian bankers
Chairmen of the Bank of Estonia
Estonian male writers
Estonian dramatists and playwrights
20th-century Estonian writers
Estonian military personnel of the Estonian War of Independence
Recipients of the Order of the White Star, 1st Class
Riga Technical University alumni
People from Väike-Maarja Parish
Estonian people who died in Soviet detention
People who died in the Gulag